Yulia Alexandrovna Mayboroda (born 7 November 1980) is Russian theater and film actress.

Biography
Born in a family of painters. Yulia's mother —  artist Elena Sadovskaya. In 2002 she graduated from the Boris Shchukin Theatre Institute (Marina Panteleeva course).

She worked in several theaters —  Mark Rozovsky and Konstantin Raikin. Then Ruben Simonov Moscow Drama Theater.

In the movie —  since 2005.

Selected filmography
 2005: Black Goddess (TV series) as Kamilla
 2005:  Adjutants of Love  as Hortense de Beauharnais
 2006: Who's the Boss (TV series) as Alisa
 2007:  The Sovereign's Servant  as  maidservant
 2010: The War Ended Yesterday (TV series) as Katya
  2012-14:  Karpov (TV series) as Svetlana Malysheva
 2015: Interns  (TV series) as Liza
2015 Ради любви я все смогу (сериал) в роли Лена

References

External links
 Official Site
 
 Интервью с Юлией Майборода

1980 births
Living people
Actors from Rostov-on-Don
Russian film actresses
Russian television actresses
Russian stage actresses
21st-century Russian actresses